Plot For Peace is a 2013 South African documentary directed by Carlos Agulló and Mandy Jacobson.

The film tells the story of Algerian-born French businessman Jean-Yves Ollivier's involvement in Cold War-era African parallel diplomacy, the signing of the 1988 Brazzaville Protocol and discussions surrounding the eventual release of Nelson Mandela. Using archive footage from apartheid-era South Africa alongside interviews from Winnie Mandela, Thabo Mbeki, Denis Sassou-Nguesso and Mathews Phosa, Ollivier (previously unknown and referred to as 'Monsieur Jacques') is revealed as a key architect of the withdrawal of Cuban troops from Angola and a 1987 prisoner-exchange programme involving six African nations.

Plot
The film follows the role of Jean-Yves Ollivier, a prominent French businessman, in negotiating the end of the South African Border War and subsequently, the transition to multiracial democracy in South Africa.

Awards

External links 
 Plot For Peace at the Internet Movie Database
 Official website

References 

2013 films
Documentary films about apartheid
Documentary films about the South African Border War
South African documentary films
2013 documentary films